Frederick Ernest Markby (29 June 1892 – 10 May 1952) was an Australian rules footballer who played with Fitzroy in the Victorian Football League (VFL).

Notes

External links 

1892 births
1952 deaths
Australian rules footballers from Victoria (Australia)
Fitzroy Football Club players